Relax–GAM Fuenlabrada (UCI Code: REG) was a professional cycling team based in Spain. It participated in UCI Europe Tour and when selected as a wildcard to UCI ProTour events.

In 2006, Relax-Gam received a wild card invitation from the organisers to participate in the Vuelta a España. For the 2007 season, Relax have signed Francisco Mancebo and Santiago Pérez to lead the team.

2007 team

Major wins 
 1st, Team classification, Volta a Catalunya (UCI ProTour)
 2nd Overall, Vuelta al País Vasco (UCI ProTour), Ángel Vicioso
 1st, Stage 3, Vuelta al País Vasco, Ángel Vicioso
 1st, Mountains classification, Vuelta Asturias, Julian Sanchez Pimienta

Team roster 
As of May 28, 2007.

References

External links
 Colchones Relax (Spanish)

Defunct cycling teams based in Spain
Cycling teams established in 1993
Cycling teams disestablished in 2007